The May Fair Hotel is a luxury hotel on Stratton Street in Mayfair, London, near the site of Devonshire House in Piccadilly. It opened in 1927 with King George V and Queen Mary in attendance. The hotel is now owned by Edwardian Hotels, and Inderneel Singh, son of the chairman and CEO Jasminder Singh, is the managing director.

The 404-room hotel completed a $150 million renovation in November 2006. The building also houses the May Fair Theatre, which opened in 1963.

In 2005, a blue plaque was unveiled to commemorate dance band leader Ambrose, who performed regularly at the hotel. Eric Parkin was a cocktail pianist there in the 1940s.

In June 2019, the hotel joined the Radisson Collection brand.

References

External links
 

Hotel and leisure companies of the United Kingdom
Hotels in London
Buildings and structures in Mayfair